Oasis or Casa-Oasis is a railway station in Casablanca. In the past few years it has handled an increased numbers of passengers.

History 
The newly renovated station was officially opened on 4 January 2005 after major modernisation work by the ONCF, with a total MAD 13m investment. All southern inter-city train services to and from Casa-Voyageurs now call at Casa-Oasis.

Services
Al BidaouiTNR Casablanca – SettatTNR Casablanca – El Jadida Main line trains

References

External links 
 

Railway stations in Morocco
Buildings and structures in Casablanca
Transport in Casablanca
Railway stations opened in 1912
1912 establishments in Morocco
20th-century architecture in Morocco